Goldthwaite is a town in Mills County, Texas, United States, that serves as the county seat. The population was 1,878 at the 2010 census.

History
Goldthwaite existed as a small village prior to the arrival of the Gulf, Colorado and Santa Fe Railway in 1885.  The population increased after the railway began selling lots. The town is named after George (Joe) Goldthwaite (1836–1892), an employee at the railway. Goldthwaite was once known as "The City of Windmills" because of the large number of wells in the city.

Geography

Climate
The climate in this area is characterized by hot, humid summers and generally mild to cool winters.  According to the Köppen climate classification system, Goldthwaite has a humid subtropical climate, Cfa on climate maps.

Demographics

2020 census

As of the 2020 United States census, there were 1,738 people, 742 households, and 463 families residing in the city.

2000 census
At the 2000 census, there were 1,802 people, 740 households and 466 families residing in the city. The population density was 1,047.4 per square mile (404.5/km). There were 883 housing units at an average density of 513.2 per square mile (198.2/km). The racial makeup of the city was 87.01% White, 0.39% African American, 0.06% Native American, 0.17% Asian, 0.11% Pacific Islander, 10.82% from other races, and 1.44% from two or more races. Hispanic or Latino of any race were 18.42% of the population.

There were 740 households, of which 29.1% had children under the age of 18 living with them, 48.8% were married couples living together, 11.6% had a female householder with no husband present, and 37.0% were non-families. 35.3% of all households were made up of individuals, and 23.4% had someone living alone who was 65 years of age or older. The average household size was 2.23 and the average family size was 2.87.

Age distribution was 24.6% under the age of 18, 4.9% from 18 to 24, 21.4% from 25 to 44, 20.5% from 45 to 64, and 28.5% who were 65 years of age or older. The median age was 44 years. For every 100 females, there were 81.5 males. For every 100 females age 18 and over, there were 76.1 males.

The median household income was $26,731, and the median family income was $34,940. Males had a median income of $25,577 versus $19,602 for females. The per capita income for the city was $14,591. About 12.5% of families and 18.7% of the population were below the poverty line, including 21.8% of those under age 18 and 22.2% of those age 65 or over.

Education
Goldthwaite is served by the Goldthwaite Independent School District.  Schools located in Goldthwaite included Goldthwaite Elementary School, Goldthwaite Middle School, and Goldthwaite High School. New Horizons Ranch School is located off Farm-to-Market Road 574.

Infrastructure
The City of Goldthwaite owns and operates the Goldthwaite Municipal Airport, a general aviation airport with a  asphalt runway. The airport originally opened in 2011. In 2015, 10 T-hangars, a hangar apron, an access road, and a garage storage area for a courtesy car were constructed, and a fly-in golf program was offered in partnership with the adjacent golf course.

Notable people

 Jody Conradt, women's basketball coach at University of Texas at Austin.  The high school gymnasium in Goldthwaite is named for her

References

External links

 Community Website

Cities in Texas
Cities in Mills County, Texas
County seats in Texas
Populated places established in 1885